East Is West is a 1922 American silent drama film directed by Sidney Franklin and starring Constance Talmadge. The film is based on a 1918 Broadway stage play of the same name starring Fay Bainter as Ming Toy. It was remade as a talkie at Universal in 1930 with Lupe Vélez.

Cast
Constance Talmadge as Ming Toy
Edmund Burns as Billy Benson (credited as Edward Burns)
E. Alyn Warren as Lo Sang Kee (credited as E.A. Warren)
Warner Oland as Charley Yong
Frank Lanning as Hop Toy
Nick De Ruiz as Chang Lee
Nigel Barrie as Jimmy Potter
Lillian Lawrence as Mrs. Benson
Winter Hall as Mr. Benson
James Wang as Boat Proprietor (credited as Jim Wang)

Preservation
A copy of East Is West is held at the EYE Film Institute Netherlands, formerly Filmmuseum Nederlands.

References

External links

Film clip from restored version at www.eyefilm.nl

1922 films
American silent feature films
Films directed by Sidney Franklin
First National Pictures films
American films based on plays
1922 drama films
1920s English-language films
Silent American drama films
American black-and-white films
1920s American films